Krapa Chintalapudi is a village in Mummidivaram Mandal, Dr. B.R. Ambedkar Konaseema district in the state of Andhra Pradesh in India.

Geography 

Demographics 
 India census, Krapa Chintalapudi had a population of 2614, out of which 1299 were male and 1315 were female. The population of children below 6 years of age was 9%. The literacy rate of the village was 77%.

References 

Villages in Mummidivaram mandal